Ema or EMA may refer to:

Biology and medicine 
 Anti-Endomysial Antibodies test
 Epithelial membrane antigen
 European Medicines Agency, a European Union agency for the evaluation of medicinal products
 European Medical Association, association representing Medical Doctors in Europe
 Emergency Medicine Australasia, a scholarly journal

Education 
 Eastern Military Academy, a defunct school in Connecticut
 Education Maintenance Allowance, a financial scheme for students in Scotland, Wales and Northern Ireland
 Escuela Mexicana Americana, a school in Mexico City

Engineering, science and technology 
 Effective medium approximations, modeling that describes the macroscopic properties of composite materials
 Electromagnetic articulography, a method of measuring the position of parts of the mouth
 Exponential moving average
Electromechanical actuator

Government 
  Emergency Management Agency
 Emergency Management Australia, an agency of the Australian Government
 Energy Market Authority, a regulatory body in Singapore
 Ethiopian Mapping Authority
 Emergency Mobile Alert, New Zealand's nationwide mobile public warning system
 Euro-Mediterranean Association for Cooperation and Development, a German international co-operation organization

Media and entertainment 
 Egmont Manga & Anime, a German manga publishing company
 Ema (film), a 2019 Chilean drama film
 Entertainment Merchants Association, an international trade association
 Environmental Media Association, an American environmental organisation
 Environmental Media Awards
 European Mahjong Association, an international organization for the interests of Mahjong in Europe
 Mother (2016 Estonian film), a 2016 Estonian drama film

Music 
 EMA (TV series), Slovenian Eurovision Song Contest selection
 Entertainment Monitoring Africa, a South African record chart
 Eska Music Awards, a Polish awards ceremony
 MTV Europe Music Awards, an award presented by Viacom International Media Networks

People 
 Ema Burgić Bucko (born 1992), Bosnian tennis player
 Ema Derossi-Bjelajac (born 1926), Croatian politician
 Ema Fujisawa (born 1982), Japanese model and actress
 Ema Klinec (born 1998), Slovenian ski jumper
 Ema Kogure (born 1976), Japanese voice actress
 Ema Kuribayashi (born 1983), Japanese cricketer
 Ema Pukšec (1834–1889), Polish soprano
 Ema Ramusović (born 1996), Montenegrin handball player
 Ema Saikō (1787–1861), Japanese painter, poet, and calligrapher
 Ema Shah (born 1981), Kuwaiti singer, composer, and director
 Tamotsu Ema, Japanese dive bomber pilot
 Ema Tōyama (born 1981), Japanese manga artist
 Ema Twumasi (born 1997), Ghanaian footballer
 Ema Wolf (born 1948), Argentine writer and journalist
 Erika M. Anderson (born 1982), stage name EMA, American singer/songwriter
  (born 1992), tennis player
 , Albanian singer
  (born 1998), badminton player
  (born 1985), Brazilian actress
  (born 1995), skater
 , actor

Fictional characters
 Ema Skye a character from Ace Attorney franchise

Other uses
 East Midlands Airport, in England
 Electronic Money Association, a European trade body
 Ema (Shinto), wooden plaques used by Shintō and Buddhist worshippers
 Emmet Monument Association, a mid-nineteenth century American Irish nationalist group
 Engineers' and Managers' Association, a former British trade union
 Tropical Storm Ema, list of tropical storms in the Pacific Ocean with this name 
 Greater rhea (Rhea americana), a flightless bird of South America
 Kemak people, a Timorese ethnic group

See also 
 Emma (disambiguation)
 Europe, the Middle East and Africa (EMEA)
 EMAS (disambiguation)

Japanese feminine given names